Djames Nascimento da Silva (born 27 December 1977), known as Testinha, is a Brazilian retired football midfielder.

References

1977 births
Living people
Brazilian footballers
Rio Branco Football Club players
Leça F.C. players
C.S. Marítimo players
Coritiba Foot Ball Club players
Cianorte Futebol Clube players
Centro Sportivo Alagoano players
Associação Botafogo Futebol Clube players
Association football midfielders
Primeira Liga players
Brazilian expatriate footballers
Expatriate footballers in Portugal
Brazilian expatriate sportspeople in Portugal
People from Rio Branco, Acre
Sportspeople from Acre (state)